Lecithocera tridentata is a moth in the family Lecithoceridae. It was described by Chun-Sheng Wu and You-Qiao Liu in 1993. It is found in Jiangxi, China.

The wingspan is 13–14 mm. The species resembles Lecithocera sigillata, but this species has white forewings.

References

Moths described in 1993
tridentata
Moths of Asia